Paddy Christie (born c. 1945) is a Scottish journalist.  She originally comes from Stonehaven

She initially worked on the Aberdeen Evening Express.

She then worked as a reporter for BBC Scotland's news programme Reporting Scotland.  She then moved to Scottish Television and reported for Scotland Today.

She was in a relationship with Donald Findlay, a leading Scottish lawyer, during roughly 1994 to 1999.  They first met some years earlier during her time as a court reporter.  Towards the end of their relationship she was bothered by nuisance calls from a former colleague of Findlay.

References

Living people
BBC Scotland newsreaders and journalists
STV News newsreaders and journalists
1940s births
People from Stonehaven